Talis or TALIS may refer to:

People
 Talis J. Colberg, attorney general of Alaska, appointed 2006
 Talis Kitsing, Estonian kickboxer and politician
 Talis Kimberley, English folk singer-songwriter

Places
 Talis, Pakistan, a village in Ghanche District, Pakistan
 Talış (disambiguation), any of several places in Azerbaijan and Iran

Other uses
 Talis (moth), a genus of moths of the family Crambidae
 Talis Group, a software company in Birmingham, England
 Tallit, a Jewish prayer shawl
 Metaclazepam, an anxiolytic drug (trade name Talis)
 Teaching and Learning International Survey, an OECD survey

See also
 Tallis (disambiguation)
 Thales (disambiguation)
 Thalys, a train service between Paris, Brussels, Cologne and Amsterdam